Company Secretary (India) is a qualified secretary of Institute of Company Secretaries of India. Prerequisite for membership are successful completion of the institute’s theory and practical training exams. Company secretaries are required for every Indian Company listing on the stock exchange, public or private, with share capital of Rs 10 crores or higher. As a qualified professional, a company secretary is required to perform the duties enumerated by the Institute for organisations engaged in manufacturing or service for ensuring proper compliance with legal and taxation-related controls to be followed through the course of its operations. These policies clear any ambiguities for the organisations in the maintenance of their books of accounts. The Institute of Company Secretaries of India has 64,000 Company Secretaries. Their role includes facilitating Meetings of the Board of Directors, providing guidance on formation, mergers and liquidations, and representing the company in arbitration or the Company Law Board among other tasks.

History and Objective 
A Company Secretary is an individual who has qualified for the examinations and completed the required practical and theoretical sessions conducted by the Institute of Company Secretaries of India, a body of registered Company Secretaries formed in 1980. Every Indian public or private company with paid up share capital of at least Rs 10 crore or greater and listed on the stock market needs a full-time company secretary who handles legal obligations related to the company.

Eligibility Criteria 

Following are the required educational qualifications for the three levels:

Company Secretary Executive Entrance Test 

 An aspirant can enroll for Company Secretary Executive Entrance Test after completion of 12th class from recognized Board or Institution.

Executive Level 

 An aspirant can enroll for Executive Level of Company Secretary after passing of foundation conducted by the Institute of Company Secretaries of India.

 Is an undergraduate in any field of specialization from a recognized Institution or university with 50 percent or above.

 Is an undergraduate in any field of specialization from a recognized Institution or university with 50 percent or less should get qualified in Company Secretary Executive Entrance Test (CSEET).

 Is a postgraduate in any field of specialization from a recognized Institution or university.

 Minimum of 17 years with no maximum limit.

Professional Level 

 Successful completion of foundation and executive levels.

Responsibilities 

A full time Company Secretary in India is needed for a company with capital of 10 crores or more to perform following activities:

 Planning and facilitating Board of Director meetings.

 Acts as Registrar for Company.

 Guiding the formation of new companies, mergers of companies, and liquidations of companies.

 Administration-related tasks as Chief Administration officer.

 Making of policies for Company in accordance with Capital Markets.

 Secretarial assignments as principal secretary.

 Adherence to regulations on tax as Administrative Secretary.

 Adherence to regulations on various legal issues.

 Guidelines on accountancy and audit as Corporate Planner.

 Scheduling internal and external appointments as Administrative Assistant.

 Representation of Company in Registrar of Companies.

 Representation of Company in issues related to arbitration.

Curriculum 

Following are the curriculum and eligibility for clearance of each of the stages:

Company Secretary Executive Entrance Test  

Includes four subjects of 100 marks each and duration of exam being 3 hours each.

Paper 1: Communication at Business Levels.

Paper 2: Aptitude on Legal matters with Logical Reasoning.

Paper 3: Business Environment and Economics. 

Paper 4: Affairs on Current Events.

Qualifying Marks

Examination for Company Secretary Executive Entrance Test is conducted four times a year.

Company Secretary Executive Examination 

The Intermediate Exam consists of 4 papers each in two groups carrying 100 marks each with a prescribed time limit of 3 hours during the exam.

Paper 1: General Laws, Interpretation and Jurisprudence.

Paper 2: Management and Corporate Accounting.

Paper 3: Corporate Laws.

Paper 4: Capital Markets and Security Laws.

Paper 5: Procedures for setting up and closure of Business Entities.

Paper 6: Commercial, Business and Economic Laws.

Paper 7: Laws on Taxation.

Paper 8: Strategic and Financial Management.

Marks needed to Qualify

An aspirant needs to get 40 percent minimum in each subject and an aggregate of 50 percent in all subjects to qualify for the intermediate examination. If a candidate appears for examination for both groups and if he is able to secure minimum qualified marks in all subjects in either group or both groups but fails to get aggregate in any group then the same can be set off from the excess marks from other groups. However, if the marks do not meet the aggregate criteria in the required group, the person testing fails for the group and cannot secure the necessary aggregate score and needs to test again.

Company Secretary Professional Examination 

The Final exam in Company Secretary has 8 papers of 100 marks each, which are divided into four subjects in two groups. The exam duration for each subject is 3 hours.

Paper 1: Ethics and Compliance, Risk Management, Governance.

Paper 2: Due Diligence and Compliance Management, Secretarial Audit.

Paper 3: Stock Exchange Listings and Corporate Funding.

Paper 4: Tax Laws at Advanced Levels.

Paper 5: Winding up and Liquidation, Insolvency, Corporate Restructuring.

Paper 6: Open book exam on case studies for Multi-Discipline.

Paper 7: Appearances, Pleadings and Drafting.

Paper 8: Corporate Dispute Resolutions, Remedies and Non-Compliances.

Paper 9: Elective Preferences of 1 out of 8 below.

 Law and Practice for Banking.

 Law and Practice for Insurance.

 Law and Practice for Intellectual Property Rights.

 Forensic Audit.

 Law and Practice for Direct Taxation.

 Law and Practice relating to Labour.

 Business Modelling and Valuations.

 Law and Practice relating to Insolvency Procedures.

Qualifying Marks

A candidate can either opt to attempt for single or both groups in an examination, however, he can aim for All India Rank in the examination only if he attends and clears both groups at a time and is able to secure marks at top 50 candidates level attending from country.

An aspirant needs to get 40 percent minimum in each subject and an aggregate of 50 percent in all subjects, to qualify in the Final examination. If a candidate appears for examination for both groups and if he is able to secure minimum qualified marks in all subjects in either groups or both groups but fails to get aggregate in any group than the same can be set off from the excess marks from other group. However if still the marks are unable to meet the aggregate criteria in the required group, then he is considered as fail for the group he is unable to secure the aggregate and needs to attend again.

Mandatory Training 

Company Secretary needs to complete below mandatory trainings during the training period when Rs 10,000 per month stipend is given:

 Training in Computers.

 Induction programme for Students.

 Programme on Executive Development.

 Specialised agency training.

 Development Programme for Professionals.

 Orientation programme for management-related subjects.

 Respective Internships with collaborated entities (Three years after post Executive Level Registration, or post clearance of Executive exam for two years or post clearance of professional exam for one year).

 For getting a membership in the Institute of Company Secretaries of India, attending the Corporate Leadership Development Programme is mandatory after the completion of three levels.

Examination and Fee Structure 

The Examination by Institute of Company Secretaries of India of India at Executive and Professional levels are conducted two times in a year in months of June and December. Details of fee structure for various levels are 1. Company Secretary Executive - Rs 8,800 (Registration - Rs 1,500, Tuition Fee - Rs 5,000, Examination form fee - Rs 1,800, Examination Fee - Rs 500). 2. Company Secretary Professional - Rs 13,250 (Registration - Rs 1,500, Tuition Fee - Rs 9,500, Examination form fee - Rs 2,250).

Recognition 

Company Secretary are eligible for courses to do Ph.D in universities based in India, National Eligibility Test (NET) conducted by UGC and the award of Fellowship in Junior Research or Assistant Professor as the degree holders of Chartered Accountancy (CA) course are considered equivalent to Post Graduates by the UGC.

Related Articles 

 Institute of Company Secretaries of India.

References

External links 
 Official Website
 Official Website

Company secretaries
Corporate governance in India